"You and the Night and the Music" is a popular song composed by Arthur Schwartz with lyrics by Howard Dietz.

The song was debuted in the Broadway show Revenge with Music. The show originally opened on November 28, 1934, ran for 22 performances, after which it closed.  It then reopened on December 24, 1934, and ran for an additional 135 performances. Authors Caryl Brahms and Ned Sherrin, in their book Song by Song: 14 Great Lyric Writers, say that “...the musical yielded two enduring hits and a profit although it was an artistic failure.”

Notable Recordings
Popular recordings in 1935 were by Libby Holman and by Leo Reisman (vocal by Phil Dewey). The song has since become an enduring jazz standard with notable recordings by Frank Sinatra, Bill Evans, Chet Baker, Stan Getz, Keith Jarrett, Julie London, Jamie Cullum, and Lennie Niehaus.

The song was sampled on The Caretaker’s 1999 album Selected Memories from the Haunted Ballroom as part of the track “You and the Night”.

See also
List of 1930s jazz standards

References

1930s jazz standards
1934 songs
Songs with music by Arthur Schwartz
Songs with lyrics by Howard Dietz
Songs about music
Songs from musicals